Sooty is a British children's television series, created and presented by Richard Cadell, and premiered on CITV on 5 November 2001, running for three series. The programme is the fourth programme in the franchise of the same name, and replaced Sooty Heights, with Cadell supported by co-presenter Vicki Lee Taylor, and Brenda Longman during the first series, and Sheila Clark for the remaining series. The programme focuses on the exploits of the titular character and his puppet friends in their running of the hotel, and features many elements used in previous programmes. The show saw the return of a puppet character from the franchise, as well as the creation of a new character.

The programme was originally produced by Gullane Entertainment, before the production company was bought up by HIT Entertainment following the first series. HIT's decision to cut costs and make changes to the programme, including using new puppets, resulted in several members of production leaving the programme, and Sooty being eventually cancelled in January 2004 due to falling viewing figures. In conclusion, Vicki Lee Taylor left the programme and it was revamped into a new series of the same name in 2011 in which Richard, Sooty, Sweep and Soo quit running the hotel and began running a holiday park instead.

Premise
Sooty focuses on the misadventures of the titular character of the programme and his friends – Sweep, Soo, and Little Cousin Scampi – managing a hotel alongside their close friends Richard Cadell and Vicki Lee Taylor. Along with them, the group are also joined by Butch – another dog whom the group have been with before, who attempts various jobs that the group find themselves assigning to him – and Miki – a Brazilian cat who joins the hotel as its chef. The programme functions on the same format as Sooty Heights and previous programmes in the Sooty franchise, including slapstick humour, guest stars, and music and songs.

Cast
Richard Cadell – presenter
Vicki Lee Taylor – co-presenter
Sooty – a mute yellow bear who is the protagonist of the show. He owns a magic wand whose power is invoked using the words "Izzy wizzy, let's get busy".
Sweep – a dim-witted grey dog with a penchant for bones and sausages. He communicates using bizarre squeaks.
Soo – a calm and collected female panda who acts as the foil for both Sooty and Sweep and usually wears a red skirt. She was voiced by her long-time voice actor Brenda Longman in Series 1, but was replaced with Sheila Clark for Season 2 and 3.
Little Cousin Scampi – Sooty's cousin, who is very cheeky and a serial troublemaker. He wears a navy-blue school uniform and, like Sooty, is mute. However, in this show he is rarely seen.
Butch The Dog – a bull dog who often visits the hotel.
Miki – a Brazilian cat who is also the hotel's chef. She is a new character made especially for this show.

Episodes

Series 1 (2001)
 "All New Sooty" (5 November 2001)
 "A New Arrival" (6 November 2001)
 "Sci Fi Sooty" (7 November 2001)
 "It's My Party" (8 November 2001)
 "Sweep Asleep" (9 November 2001)
 "Sad Sad Sooty" (12 November 2001)
 "It's a Dog's Life" (13 November 2001)
 "Practice Makes Perfect" (14 November 2001)
 "Night of a Thousand Bears" (15 November 2001)
 "You Don't Scare Me" (16 November 2001)
 "A Cat and Dog Thing" (19 November 2001)
 "Favourite Things" (20 November 2001)
 "Santa's Back" (21 November 2001)

Source:

Series 2 (2002)
 "Robo Richard" (15 October 2002)
 "The Mysterious Visitor" (22 October 2002)
 "Sooty's Pet" - (29 October 2002)
 "Superheroes" (5 November 2002)
 "Sooty in Charge" (12 November 2002)
 "Sooty's Magic Garden" (19 November 2002)
 "The New Gang" (26 November 2002)
 "The Little Big People" (3 December 2002)
 "Digging for Dinosaurs" (10 December 2002)
 "Best Friends" (17 December 2002)

Series 3 (2003–2004)
All episodes were filmed and produced in 2002.
 "Sooty's Baby" (27 October 2003)
 "Double Trouble" (28 October 2003)
 "Flying Fun" (29 October 2003)
 "Sooty at the Seaside" (30 October 2003)
 "Treasure Hunt" (31 October 2003)
 "Water, Water Everywhere" (7 November 2003)
 "Sooty's Ghost" (10 November 2003)
 "Let's Get Camping" (17 November 2003)
 "Sooty the Scientist" (28 November 2003)
 "Keep Fit Sooty" (6 January 2004)

References

External links
 Sooty at itv.com/citv

2001 British television series debuts
2004 British television series endings
2000s British children's television series
2000s British comedy television series
2000s British workplace comedy television series
British children's comedy television series
British television shows featuring puppetry
ITV children's television shows
ITV comedy
English-language television shows
Television series by ITV Studios
Television shows produced by Granada Television
Television series by Mattel Creations
Sooty
Gullane Entertainment